In chemistry, metatungstate refers to the anion with the formula [W12O40]8- and salts derived from this anion. The term also refers to protonated derivatives of this anion, including [H2W12O40]6-. The unprotonated anion [W12O40]12- has Td symmetry.

See also
 Paratungstate [W12O42]12-, with idealized C2h symmetry.

References 

Tungstates
Transition metal oxyanions